Pilate most commonly refers to Pontius Pilate 

Pilate may also refer to:
Pilate (band), now called Pilot Speed, a Canadian rock band formed in 1999 in Toronto, Ontario
"Pilate" (song), a song by Pearl Jam from their fifth album, Yield, released in 1998
Pilate, Haiti, a small town in Haiti
Lago di Pilato, a glacial mountain lake, Italy

People with the surname Pilate
Felton Pilate (born 1952), American musician

See also

Pilates, physical fitness system
Pilatus (disambiguation) 
Pilat (disambiguation) 
Pilati (disambiguation)
Pilot (disambiguation)